Matthew Gergely is an American politician. A Democrat, he is currently a member of the Pennsylvania House of Representatives, representing the 35th district. He was elected in a 2023 special election to succeed Austin Davis, who resigned on December 7, 2022, after being elected Lieutenant Governor of Pennsylvania.

Electoral history

References

External links

21st-century American politicians
Democratic Party members of the Pennsylvania House of Representatives
Living people
People from McKeesport, Pennsylvania
1979 births